The National Union of Workers of Guinea-Bissau (UNTG) is a national trade union center in Guinea-Bissau. It consists of 15 unions and a Working Women Commission. It is affiliated with the International Trade Union Confederation.

References

Trade unions in Guinea-Bissau
International Trade Union Confederation